F-Script is an object-oriented scripting programming language for Apple's macOS operating system developed by Philippe Mougin.  F-Script is an interactive language based on Smalltalk, using macOS's native Cocoa API.

Overview
F-Script is based on a pure object paradigm: every entity manipulated within the language is an object. Its base syntax and concepts are identical to those of the language Smalltalk (the canonical example of an object-oriented language) with specific extensions to support array programming as in the language APL.

F-Script provides an interpreted, interactive environment with support for workspaces, which provide a rich set of functions including object persistence, distributed objects, graphical user interface (GUI) framework, database access, among other things.

Syntax 
Like Smalltalk, F-Script's syntax is very simple, without requiring specific notation for control structures which are provided in a unified manner by the message send operation. Unlike Smalltalk, F-Script provides specific notational extensions to support the Array class, using curly brackets to describe literal arrays, which may contain any F-Script expressions.

For example, {1+3, 'name', true} is a valid array literal. The empty array is denoted by {}. Arrays of arrays are supported transparently, since any array is just another object.

Message sending
Message expressions in F-Script are similar to those in Smalltalk: they specify which object is the receiver of the message, which operation is called by the message, and any argument objects needed by the operation. F-Script supports unary, binary, and keyword messages.
F-Script message semantics are extended to support array programming by recognizing that an array operation, such as adding to numerical vectors, must be viewed as generating a number of messages relating the elements of the vectors involved

Thus, if A = {1, 2, 3} and B = {10, 20, 30}, then F-Script allows A + B = {11, 22, 33}.

Usage
F-Script is chiefly used as a lightweight scripting layer on top of macOS's Cocoa application programming interface (API). It can be embedded in applications using the F-Script framework and Interface Builder palettes. It can also be used interactively from the F-Script interpreter to prototype applications. Finally, it can be used to explore applications' object hierarchies using an injector such as F-Script Anywhere.

Forks
The original F-script development by Philippe Mougin stopped at version 2.1 in 2011. Ilya Kulakov (Kentzo) took over the FScript.org website and updated the program to work with Mac OS X 10.7 through 10.10 until version 2.3 of 2014, building off Jonathan Mitchell's modernization work. Kulakov noted that as F-Script ties deeply into the system, the code must be changed to reflect the framework available in each Mac OS X release. The last update to this chain of work was done in 2018, by Wolfgang Baird, who updated F-Script to work with Mac OS X 10.12.

References

External links

F-Script Google Techtalk

Array programming languages
Class-based programming languages
Dynamically typed programming languages
Object-oriented programming languages
Scripting languages
Smalltalk programming language family